Alison M. Gingeras is an American curator and writer, based in New York and Warsaw. She has held positions at numerous institutions including the Guggenheim Museum, the Musée national d'art moderne, Centre Pompidou and the Palazzo Grassi.  As a writer she contributes to publications such as Artforum, Parkett and Tate Etc. When working as curator for contemporary art at the Centre Pompidou in Paris (1999 - 2004), she organized several exhibitions, including ‘Dear Painter, Paint Me: Painting the Figure Since Late Picabia’; ‘Daniel Buren Le Musee qui n’existait pas’, as well as projects with Urs Fischer, Thomas Hirschhorn and Kristin Baker. In 2005, she was a co-curator of Daniel Buren: ‘The Eye of the Storm’ at the Solomon R. Guggenheim Museum in New York. She has been curating a small project space in New York's east village since 2012 called Oko.

Criticism
Of her exhibition at the Frieze Art Fair in London, "Sex Work: Feminist Art & Radical Politics," Hyperallergic's Zachary Small questioned its politicized intent, writing:

References

Living people
American art curators
American women curators
Writers from New York (state)
Year of birth missing (living people)
21st-century American women